E-Werk may refer to of a number of music venues across Germany, including

E-Werk (Berlin)
E-Werk (Cologne)
E-Werk (Erlangen)
E-Werk (Saarbrücken) (:de:E-Werk (Saarbrücken))